The Canadian women's national basketball team represents Canada in international basketball competitions. They are overseen by Canada Basketball, the governing body of basketball in Canada. They are currently ranked fourth by FIBA.

History

Pan American Games 2015
The Canada women's national basketball team participated in basketball at the 2015 Pan American Games held in Toronto, Ontario, Canada July 10 to 26, 2015. Canada opened the preliminary rounds with an easy 101–38 win over Venezuela. The following day they beat Argentina 73–58. The final preliminary game was against Cuba; both teams were 2–0, so the winner would win the group. The game went down to the wire with Canada eking out a 71–68 win. Canada would face Brazil in the semi-final.

Canada opened the semi-final with an 11–2 run on seven consecutive points by Miranda Ayim. Miah-Marie Langlois contributed five assists. In the third quarter Canada strongly out rebounded Brazil and hit 69% of their field goals to score 33 points in the quarter. Lizanne Murphy and Nirra Fields hit three-pointers to help extend the lead to 68–39 at the end of three-quarters. Canada continued to dominate in the fourth quarter with three-pointers by Nurse and Kim Gaucher. Canada went on to win the game 91–63 to earn a spot in the gold-medal game against the USA.

The gold-medal game matched up the host team Canada against USA, in a sold-out arena dominated by fans in red and white and waving the Canadian flag. The Canadian team, arm in arm, sang Oh Canada as the respective national anthems were played.

After trading baskets early the US edged out to a double-digit lead in the second quarter. However the Canadians, with the home crowd cheering, tied up the game at halftime. In the third quarter Canada outscored the US 26–15. The lead would reach as high as 18 points. The USA would fight back, but not all the way and Canada won the game and the gold-medal 81–73. It was Canada's first gold-medal in basketball in the Pan Am games. Kia Nurse was the star for Canada with 33 points, hitting 11 of her 12 free-throw attempts in 10 of her 17 field-goal attempts including two of three three-pointers.

FIBA Americas Women's Championship 2015
Canada participated at the 2015 FIBA Americas Women's Championship, a qualifying event used to determine invitations to the 2016 Olympics. The games were held in Edmonton, Alberta, Canada in August 2015. Canada was assigned to Group A and played Puerto Rico, Chile, the Dominican Republic and Cuba in the preliminary rounds. Canada won the first three games easily with a 94–57 win over Puerto Rico as the closest match. The final preliminary round game was against undefeated Cuba, a team Canada had faced in the Pan Am games. Cuba played well in that event and was expected to challenge Canada. However, Canada defeated Cuba 92–43 to win first place in the group for a spot in the semi-final against the second-place team in group B, Brazil.

The semi-final game against Brazil was much closer. Canada led by only six points at halftime but gradually expanded the lead to end up with an 83–66 win, and a spot in the gold-medal game. The gold-medal game was a rematch with Cuba who won their semi-final game against Argentina. Despite the lopsided result in the preliminary rounds, Canada expected a closer game. Cuba started off strong and had an eight-point lead early in the game. Canada responded with a 16–0 run to take over the lead, but Cuba responded and took a small lead early in the second half. Then Canada took the lead back and gradually expanded the lead to end up with the win, 82–66. As the game wound down to the close, the crowd was chanting "Rio","Rio","Rio" in recognition of the fact that the win qualifies Canada for the Olympics in Rio in 2016.

Team

Current roster 
Roster fot the 2022 FIBA Women's Basketball World Cup.

Competitive record

Summer Olympics
 1976 – 6th place
 1984 – 4th place
 1996 – 11th place
 2000 – 10th place
 2012 – 8th place
 2016 – 7th place
 2020 – 9th place

FIBA World Cup
 1971 – 10th place
 1975 – 11th place
 1979 –  Third place
 1983 – 9th place
 1986 –  Third place
 1990 – 7th place
 1994 – 7th place
 2006 – 11th place
 2010 – 12th place
 2014 – 5th place
 2018 – 7th place
 2022 – 4th place

FIBA AmeriCup 
 1989 –  Third place
 1993 –  Third place
 1995 –  First place
 1997 – 5th place
 1999 –  Third place
 2001 – 4th place
 2003 –  Third place
 2005 –  Third place
 2007 – 5th place
 2009 –  Third place
 2011 –  Third place
 2013 –  Second place
 2015 –  First place
 2017 –  First place
 2019 –  Second place
 2021 – 4th place

Pan American Games
 1955 – 5th place
 1959 – 4th place
 1963 – 4th place
 1967 –  Third place
 1971 – 5th place
 1975 – 5th place
 1979 –  Third place
 1983 – 4th place
 1987 –  Third place
 1991 – 4th place
 1995 – Cancelled
 1999 –  Second place
 2003 – 4th place
 2007 – 4th place
 2011 – 6th place
 2015 –  First place
 2019 – 6th place

Commonwealth Games
 2018 – 4th place

3x3 Team
Canada features a 3x3 women's team, which, in 2019 defeated the United States women's national 3x3 team for the 4th consecutive time.

See also

Canada Basketball
FIBA Americas
Canada men's national basketball team
Canada women's national under-19 basketball team
Canada women's national under-17 basketball team

References

External links

FIBA profile
USBasket.com – Canada Women National Team
Archived records of Canada team participations

 
Canada
basketball